The 1991–92 South Florida Bulls men's basketball team represented the University of South Florida Bulls in the 1991–92 NCAA Division I men's basketball season. This was the 21st season in school history. The team was coached by Bobby Paschal in his sixth year at the school, and USF played its home games in the USF Sun Dome. The Bulls finished the season 19–10, 7–5 in Metro Conference play, and received an at-large bid to the NCAA tournament. USF lost to Georgetown in the first round.

Roster

Schedule and results

|-
!colspan=9 style=| Regular season

|-
!colspan=9 style=| Metro Conference tournament

|-
!colspan=9 style=| NCAA tournament

References

South Florida Bulls men's basketball seasons
South Florida
South Florida
South Florida Bulls men's basketball team
South Florida Bulls men's basketball team